Havana Tunnel is a route under the Havana Bay, built by the French company Societé de Grand Travaux de Marseille between 1957-58. The president of the Republic Fulgencio Batista planned to expand the city to Habana del Este with a new suburb, and a new connection between Havana Vieja and the east side across Havana Bay was required. 

The tunnel extends from the Paseo de Prado, is 733 m long and 12 m below ground level. It takes a driver 45 seconds traveling at a speed of 60 km/h to traverse the tunnel. In the 1970s the new suburb of Alamar in East Havana was built with the aid of the former Soviet Union. The new suburb was composed of Soviet-style concrete buildings, with no city center or character.

Gallery

See also
Havana Plan Piloto
Havana Harbor
Malecón, Havana
Habana del Este

Notes

References

External links

Buildings and structures in Havana
History of Havana
Tunnels in Cuba